is a passenger railway station located in the town of Utazu, Ayauta District, Kagawa Prefecture, Japan. It is operated by JR Shikoku and has the station number "Y09".

Lines
The station is served by the JR Shikoku Yosan Line and is located 25.9 km from the beginning of the line at Takamatsu. Trains of Honshi Bisan Line (Seto Ohashi Line), also terminate at this station All passenger trains on the Yosan Line, and trains that directly run between the Honshi Bisan Line and Tadotsu Station on the Yosan Line, stop at this station, except for some limited express trains and special trains in the early morning and at night..At this station, the limited express trains ``Shiokaze/Ishizuchi, ``Minamifu/Shimanto, and ``Minamifu/Uzushio are divided and merged.

Layout
Utazu Station consists of two elevated island platforms serving four tracks. The station has a Midori no Madoguchi'' staffed ticket office.

Adjacent stations

History
Utazu Station opened on 21 February 1897, as a station on the Sanuki Railway. The Sanuki Railway became part of the Sanyo Railway in 1904, and was nationalized in 1906. With the privatization of the  Japanese National Railways (JNR) on 1 April 1987, control of the station passed to JR Shikoku.

Surrounding area
Marugame Hirai Art Museum
Kagawa Junior College
Shikoku Medical College
Utazu Municipal Utazu Kita Elementary School

See also
 List of railway stations in Japan

References

External links
Station timetable

Railway stations in Kagawa Prefecture
Railway stations in Japan opened in 1897